This article contains information about the literary events and publications of 1960.

 – Mervyn Griffith-Jones prosecuting in the Lady Chatterley's Lover case

Events
February–October – Astounding magazine is renamed Analog.
Spring – August Derleth launches the poetry magazine, Hawk and Whippoorwill in the United States.
March 22 – Joan Henry's play Look on Tempests is premièred at the Comedy Theatre in London's West End, as the first play dealing openly with homosexuality to be passed for performance by the Lord Chamberlain in Britain.
April 27 – Harold Pinter's play The Caretaker is premièred at the Arts Theatre Club in London's West End, transferring to the Duchess Theatre the following month, where it runs for 444 performances before departing from London for Broadway, Pinter's first significant commercial success. Alan Bates and Donald Pleasence star in the original production.
July 11 – Harper Lee's Southern Gothic Bildungsroman To Kill a Mockingbird is published in the United States. She completes no later novel before her death in 2016.
August 12 – Green Eggs and Ham, by Dr. Seuss, is published in the United States; 40 years on it will be the fourth-best selling English-language children's hardcover book yet written.
September 5 – Welsh poet Waldo Williams is imprisoned for six weeks for non-payment of income tax (a protest against defence spending).
October 3 – The Lilly Library is opened on the campus of Indiana University Bloomington, based on the collections of Josiah K. Lilly, Jr.
October 6 and December 16 – Dalton Trumbo, one of the Hollywood Ten, receives full screenwriting credit for his work on the films Spartacus and Exodus, released in the United States on these dates.
c. October – Vasily Grossman submits his novel Life and Fate (Жизнь и судьба) for publication, resulting in confiscation of the manuscript and all related material by the KGB in the Soviet Union.
November – Rita Rait-Kovaleva's Russian translation of The Catcher in the Rye is published in the Soviet literary magazine Inostrannaya Literatura as Над пропастью во ржи ("Over the Abyss in Rye").
November 2 – R v Penguin Books Ltd: Penguin Books is found not guilty of obscenity for publishing Lady Chatterley's Lover in the United Kingdom.
November 8 – Richard Wright delivers a polemical lecture, "The Situation of the Black Artist and Intellectual in the United States", to students and members of the American Church in Paris, a few weeks before his death there from heart attack aged 52.
November 10 – Lady Chatterley's Lover sells 200,000 copies in one day following its publication in the U.K. since being banned in 1928.
November 17 – Michael Foot is re-elected to the Parliament of the United Kingdom and relinquishes the editorship of Tribune.
November 19 – American novelist Norman Mailer stabs his wife, the artist Adele Morales.
November 24 – Raymond Queneau founds Oulipo in France.
unknown dates
Dutch mathematician Hans Freudenthal invents the artificial language Lincos, intended for communication with extraterrestrial intelligence.
Francophone African scholar Djibril Tamsir Niane publishes the novelization Soundjata, ou l'Epopée du Manding in Paris, the first extended transcription of the 13th-century Epic of Sundiata from Mandinka oral tradition and its first translation into a Western language.

New books

Fiction
Chinua Achebe – No Longer at Ease
J. R. Ackerley – We Think the World of You
Kingsley Amis – Take a Girl Like You
Poul Anderson – The High Crusade
Lynne Reid Banks – The L-Shaped Room
Stan Barstow – A Kind of Loving
John Barth – The Sot-Weed Factor
Hamilton Basso – The Light Infantry Ball
H. E. Bates – When the Green Woods Laugh
Charles Beaumont – Night Ride and Other Journeys
Robert Bloch – Pleasant Dreams: Nightmares
Algis Budrys – Rogue Moon
Anthony Burgess
The Doctor is Sick
The Right to an Answer
Morley Callaghan – The Many Colored Coat
John Dickson Carr – In Spite of Thunder
Carlo Cassola – Bébo's Girl (La ragazza di Bube)
 Henry Cecil – Alibi for a Judge
Louis-Ferdinand Céline – North (Nord)
Agatha Christie – The Adventure of the Christmas Pudding
Barry Crump – A Good Keen Man
Roald Dahl – Kiss Kiss (short stories)
L. Sprague de Camp
The Bronze God of Rhodes
The Glory That Was
L. Sprague de Camp and Fletcher Pratt – Wall of Serpents
Carmen de Icaza – The House Across the Street (La casa de enfrente)
Philip K. Dick
Dr. Futurity
Vulcan's Hammer
E. L. Doctorow – Welcome to Hard Times
Lawrence Durrell – Clea (final volume of The Alexandria Quartet, begun 1957)
Henry Farrell – What Ever Happened to Baby Jane?
Gabriel Fielding – Through Streets Broad and Narrow
Ian Fleming – For Your Eyes Only (James Bond short stories)
 Sarah Gainham – The Silent Hostage
Richard Gordon – Doctor in Clover
Graham Greene – A Burnt-Out Case
Arthur Hailey – In High Places
Donald Hamilton – Death of a Citizen
Wilson Harris – Palace of the Peacock
James Leo Herlihy – All Fall Down
Hammond Innes –  The Doomed Oasis
Michael Innes – The New Sonia Wayward
Greye La Spina – Invaders from the Dark
Jean Lartéguy – Les Centurions
Harper Lee – To Kill a Mockingbird
Clarice Lispector – Family Ties (Laços de família) (short story collection)
David Lodge – The Picturegoers
Ngaio Marsh – False Scent
John Masters – The Venus of Konpara
Richard Matheson – The Beardless Warriors
Judith Merrill – The Tomorrow People
Gladys Mitchell – Say It with Flowers
Walter M. Miller – A Canticle for Leibowitz
Nancy Mitford – Don't Tell Alfred
Alberto Moravia – La noia (The Empty Canvas)
Edna O'Brien – The Country Girls
Flannery O'Connor – The Violent Bear It Away
Scott O'Dell – Island of the Blue Dolphins
Wilder Penfield – The Torch
Frederik Pohl – Drunkard's Walk
Anthony Powell – Casanova's Chinese Restaurant
James H. Schmitz – Agent of Vega
Nevil Shute (died January 2) – Trustee from the Toolroom
Clark Ashton Smith – The Abominations of Yondo
Muriel Spark – The Ballad of Peckham Rye
Alan Sillitoe – The General
David Storey – This Sporting Life
Rex Stout
Three at Wolfe's Door
Too Many Clients
William Styron – Set This House on Fire
Julian Symons – The Progress of a Crime
John Updike – Rabbit, Run
Irving Wallace – The Chapman Report
John Edward Williams – Butcher's Crossing
Raymond Williams – Border Country
John Wyndham – Trouble with Lichen

Children and young people
Joan Aiken – The Kingdom and The Cave
Rev. W. Awdry – The Twin Engines (fifteenth in The Railway Series)
Hans Baumann – Ich zog mit Hannibal (I Marched with Hannibal, 1961)
Sheila Burnford – The Incredible Journey
P. D. Eastman – Are You My Mother?
Alan Garner – The Weirdstone of Brisingamen
Jean Craighead George – My Side of the Mountain
Rumer Godden – "Candy Floss" (short story)
Elinor Lyon – Cathie Runs Wild
Scott O'Dell – Island of the Blue Dolphins
Georges Prosper Remi (as Hergé) – Tintin au Tibet (book publication)
Dr. Seuss
Green Eggs and Ham
One Fish Two Fish Red Fish Blue Fish
Barbara Sleigh – The Kingdom of Carbonel

Drama
Edward Albee – The Death of Bessie Smith and The Sandbox (first performances)
Samuel Beckett – The Old Tune (first broadcast)
Robert Bolt – A Man for All Seasons (stage version) and The Tiger and the Horse
Marc Camoletti – Boeing-Boeing
 Henry Cecil and William Saroyan  – Settled Out of Court
Noël Coward – Waiting in the Wings
Beverley Cross – Strip the Willow
Witold Gombrowicz – The Marriage (Ślub, first performance)
Eugène Ionesco – Rhinocéros
Ira Levin – Critic's Choice
Stephen Lewis and Theatre Workshop – Sparrers Can't Sing
Bruce Mason – The End of the Golden Weather
Tad Mosel – All the Way Home
Harold Pinter
The Caretaker (first performed and published)
The Room (first professional performance)
A Night Out (first broadcast)
Terence Rattigan – Ross
Barry Reckord – You in Your Small Corner
Nelson Rodrigues – Beijo no Asfalto (The Asphalt Kiss)
Wole Soyinka – A Dance of the Forests
Gore Vidal – The Best Man
Maruxa Vilalta –  (The Disoriented Ones)
Keith Waterhouse and Willis Hall – Billy Liar
Orson Welles (adaptation) – Chimes at Midnight
Tennessee Williams – Period of Adjustment

Poetry

Douglas Livingstone – The Skull in the Mud
Sylvia Plath – The Colossus and Other Poems
Alan Sillitoe – The Rats and other poems

Non-fiction
Joy Adamson – Born Free
Kingsley Amis – New Maps of Hell
Philippe Ariès – Centuries of Childhood: A Social History of Family Life (L'Enfant et la vie familiale sous l'Ancien Régime)
Peg Bracken – The I Hate to Cook Book
Albert Camus (died January 4) – Resistance, Rebellion, and Death (selected essays)
Jean-Paul Desbiens – Les Insolences du Frère Untel (The Insolences of Brother Anonymous)
Hans-Georg Gadamer – Truth and Method (Wahrheit und Methode)
John Howard Griffin – Black Like Me
Helen Keller – Light in my Darkness
Arthur Koestler – The Lotus and the Robot
Jessica Mitford – Hons and Rebels
A. S. Neill – Summerhill: A Radical Approach to Child Rearing
Louis Pauwels and Jacques Bergier – The Morning of the Magicians (Le Matin des magiciens)
R. C. Majumdar – An Advanced History of India
Jean-Paul Sartre – Critique of Dialectical Reason (Critique de la raison dialectique)
William L. Shirer – The Rise and Fall of the Third Reich
H. H. Smythe and M. M. Smythe – The New Nigerian Elite
W. T. Stace – The Teachings of the Mystics
Elie Wiesel – Night (La Nuit, 1958)

Births
January 18 – Mark Rylance, English actor and theater director
January 23 – André Verbart, Dutch poet
January 28 – Robert von Dassanowsky, Austrian-American historian and academic
January 31 – Grant Morrison, Scottish comic-book and graphic-novel scriptwriter
February 19 – Helen Fielding, English novelist and screenwriter
March 8 – Jeffrey Eugenides, American fiction writer
April 28 – Ian Rankin, Scottish crime novelist
April 29 – Andrew Miller, English novelist
May 4 – Kate Saunders, English author and children's writer
May 21 – John O'Brien, American novelist (died 1994)
June 2 – Julie Myerson, English novelist and columnist
July 13 – Ian Hislop, Welsh-born satirist
August 4 – Tim Winton, Australian novelist
October 2 – Joe Sacco, Maltese-born graphic author
October 18 – Hồ Anh Thái, Vietnamese author
November 10 – Neil Gaiman, English author
December 10 – Kenneth Branagh, Northern Irish actor and screenwriter
unknown dates
Malcolm Pryce, Anglo-Welsh detective novelist
Alexis Stamatis, Greek novelist, playwright and poet
D. J. Taylor, English literary critic and biographer

Deaths
January 4 – Albert Camus, French Pied-Noir novelist (car accident, born 1913)
January 9 – Elsie J. Oxenham (Elsie Jeanette Dunkerley), English girls' story writer (born 1880)
January 12 – Nevil Shute, English-born novelist (stroke, born 1899)
January 14 – Ralph Chubb, English poet, printer and artist (born 1892)
January 28 – Zora Neale Hurston, African-American anthropologist and author (born 1891)
May 30 – Boris Pasternak, Russian novelist, poet and translator (born 1890)
July 27
Leonora Eyles, English feminist writer and novelist (born 1889)
Ethel Lilian Voynich, Anglo-Irish novelist and composer (born 1864)
July 28 – Kassian Bogatyrets, Rusyn priest, politician and historian (born 1868)
August 19 – Frances Cornford, English poet (born 1886)
August 29 – Vicki Baum, Austrian-born novelist writing in German and English (born 1888)
October 31 – H. L. Davis, American fiction writer and poet (born 1894)
November 20 – Ya'akov Cohen, Russian-born Israeli poet (born 1881)
November 28 – Richard Wright, African-American novelist and poet (born 1908)
December 26 – Tetsuro Watsuji (和辻 哲郎), Japanese philosopher and historian of ideas (born 1889)

Awards
American Academy of Arts and Letters Gold Medal for Criticism: E. B. White
Carnegie Medal for children's literature: Ian Wolfran Cornwall, The Making of Man
Eric Gregory Award: Christopher Levenson
James Tait Black Memorial Prize for fiction: Rex Warner, Imperial Caesar
James Tait Black Memorial Prize for biography: Canon Adam Fox, The Life of Dean Inge
Kate Greenaway Medal: Gerald Rose, Old Winkle and the seagulls
Miles Franklin Award: Elizabeth O'Conner, The Irishman
Newbery Medal for children's literature: Joseph Krumgold, Onion John
Nobel Prize for literature: Saint-John Perse
Pulitzer Prize for Drama: Jerome Weidman, George Abbott for book, Jerry Bock for music, and Sheldon Harnick for lyrics, Fiorello!
Pulitzer Prize for Fiction: Allen Drury, Advise and Consent
Pulitzer Prize for Poetry: W. D. Snodgrass, Heart's Needle
Queen's Gold Medal for Poetry: John Betjeman

References

 
Years of the 20th century in literature